Tuya Inc. (dba Tuya Smart) is a Chinese artificial intelligence and Internet of things (IoT) platform as a service provider founded in 2014. The company provides a cloud development and management platform to developers, brands, and OEMs to program, manage, and monetize smart home and IoT devices.

Tuya is supported by New Enterprise Associates and Tencent. In March 2021, it raised $915 million in a U.S. initial public offering and trades on the NYSE. It launched a global offering on the Hong Kong Stock Exchange in July 2022, giving itself dual primary listings in Hong Kong and New York.

Internationally, Tuya partners with companies including Schneider Electric, Lenovo, and Philips. It is a member on the board of directors of the Connectivity Standards Alliance and has committed to supporting the Matter connectivity standard.

References

External links 

 

Companies of China